Pedra Furada is a collection of archaeological sites in the state of Piauí, Brazil.

Pedra Furada may also refer to:

 Pedra Furada (Santa Catarina), a naturally formed rock arch in Urubici, Brazil
 Pedra Furada, former Portuguese civil parish now part of Chorente, Góios, Courel, Pedra Furada e Gueral
 Cave of Pedra Furada in Portugal